Patricia Anne Stratigeas (born December 18, 1975), better known by the ring name Trish Stratus, is a Canadian professional wrestler, actress, and yoga instructor. She is currently signed with WWE were she performs on the Raw brand. Often regarded the greatest women's performer of all time, she was also one of the most popular wrestlers in WWE. 

After beginning her career as a fitness model, Stratigeas began working for the World Wrestling Federation (WWF), which was later renamed World Wrestling Entertainment (WWE) in 2002. Early in her career, she was mostly involved in sexually themed storylines, such as managing the team T & A and a kayfabe affair with WWE owner Vince McMahon. As Stratus spent more time in the ring, her perceived wrestling skills strengthened and her popularity increased because of this, she was made a one-time WWE Hardcore Champion, three-time "WWE Babe of the Year", and was proclaimed "Diva of the Decade". After nearly seven years in the business, Stratus retired from professional wrestling on a full-time basis at WWE Unforgiven on September 17, 2006, after winning her record-setting seventh WWE Women's Championship.

Following her full-time performing, she would make occasional appearances and wrestle part-time in WWE. In 2011, Stratus was a trainer for WWE Tough Enough. She was inducted into the WWE Hall of Fame in 2013. In 2018, she returned to WWE, participating in the 2018 Women's Royal Rumble and later competing at the all-female Evolution event in October of that year. She had another match against Charlotte Flair at SummerSlam 2019. The following year she became the first woman to receive the Lou Thesz Award from the George Tragos/Lou Thesz Professional Wrestling Hall of Fame. In 2021, WWE named Stratus as the greatest female superstar of all time. In 2023, she came out of retirement once again and is set to participate in a six-woman tag team match at WrestleMania 39.

Aside from professional wrestling, Stratus has appeared on a number of magazine covers and has been involved in charity work. She has also hosted several award and television shows and formerly owned a yoga studio. Since 2022, Stratus has been a judge on Canada's Got Talent.

Early life 
Stratigeas was born in Toronto, Ontario, Canada, and attended Bayview Secondary School in Richmond Hill, Ontario. She enrolled at York University, where she studied biology and kinesiology and played soccer and field hockey. Due to a faculty strike in 1997, she was forced to change her plans. She was working as a receptionist at a local gym when she was approached by the publisher of MuscleMag International to do a test shoot for the magazine. She later appeared on the cover of the May 1998 issue and was signed to a two-year contract. For the next six months, she worked on her body and appeared on numerous magazine covers. During this time, she joined Big Daddy Donnie & Jeff Marek as the third host of Live Audio Wrestling on Toronto Sports Radio, The FAN 590.

Stratigeas had been a fan of wrestling since childhood and was especially fond of wrestlers Hulk Hogan and Randy Savage, among others. Her modelling work caught the attention of the World Wrestling Federation (WWF). In November 1999, she was signed to a multi-year contract with the company, who sent her to Sully's Gym where she was trained by Ron Hutchison.

Professional wrestling career

World Wrestling Federation/World Wrestling Entertainment/WWE

T & A (2000–2001) 

Stratigeas made her debut as a heel on the March 19, 2000 episode of Sunday Night Heat under the ring name Trish Stratus. She appeared on stage to scout Test and Prince Albert. The next night on Raw Is War, Test and Albert joined forces as the tag team T & A and Stratus began her first role in the company as their valet. It was during her stint managing T & A that Stratus took her first major bump in the ring, by being driven through a table by the Dudley Boyz at Backlash, after she had been taunting Bubba Ray Dudley for several weeks. In June, she was on the receiving end of a stink face from Rikishi on Raw.

She also began managing then-heel, Val Venis to win the WWE Intercontinental Championship, but their partnership ended at SummerSlam after Venis lost the title.
Stratus made her in-ring debut on the June 22 episode of SmackDown!, winning a tag team match with T & A against the Hardy Boyz and Lita. A storyline feud between Stratus and Lita developed after the match with Stratus attacking Lita on episodes of Raw and SmackDown!. This led to an Indian Strap match between the two women on the July 24 episode of Raw, which Stratus won with help from Stephanie McMahon. She finished the year competing unsuccessfully for the WWF Women's Championship numerous times, and separating from Test and Albert when the team disbanded.

In early 2001, Stratus became involved in an angle with WWF Chairman Vince McMahon, during a time when Vince's wife Linda was kayfabe institutionalized following a demand Vince had made for a divorce during an episode of SmackDown!. Vince and Stratus' relationship increasingly angered the boss' daughter, then-heel, Stephanie McMahon. On the February 19 episode of Raw, Stephanie and Trish were scheduled for a match, but it quickly got cancelled due to Stephanie getting stunned by Steve Austin. At No Way Out, Stratus and Stephanie squared off, with Stephanie scoring the victory after a run-in by William Regal. In the midst of a tag team match that pitted Vince and Stratus against Regal and Stephanie the next night on Raw, Stratus was the victim of a set-up by Vince, Stephanie and Regal. Regal executed his finisher, the Regal Cutter, on Stratus and Stephanie then dumped slop over Stratus' body. Vince stood over Stratus and he told her she was a "toy" with which he had "grown tired of playing with". The angle continued the next week on Raw, with Vince forcing Stratus to strip down to her black bra and panties in the ring and bark like a dog. The storyline came to an end at WrestleMania X-Seven, when Stratus slapped Vince during his match against his son Shane, turning face in the process.

Women's Champion (2001–2003) 

Following her first face turn, Stratus began wrestling part-time. She teamed up with Lita against then-heels, Stacy Keibler and Torrie Wilson at InVasion. After suffering an ankle injury in the summer, however, she was sidelined for the following three months. This interrupted not only her recent venture into wrestling, but also an on-screen romance with Jeff Hardy and budding storyline with Team Xtreme. As she rehabilitated, she kept herself visible by co-hosting Excess on TNN. After returning in autumn, Stratus appeared at Survivor Series where she won the WWF Women's Championship for the first time in a six-pack challenge. Stratus was next involved in a feud with Jazz over the Women's Championship, where she retained the championship at the Royal Rumble, but dropped the championship to Jazz two weeks later on the February 4, 2002 episode of Raw. Stratus then attempted to regain the title for several months, including competing in a triple threat match at WrestleMania X8 against Lita and Jazz in her hometown of Toronto, but failed to win the match. While chasing after the Women's Championship, Stratus won the WWE Hardcore Championship on May 6, pinning Crash Holly after Bubba Ray Dudley hit him over the head with a trash can. She lost the title to Steven Richards soon afterward however, due to the stipulation that the belt was to be defended 24/7 as long as there was a referee present. One week later, she won the Women's Championship for the second time in a tag team match with Bubba Ray Dudley where she faced Richards and Jazz, where the Hardcore Championship was also on the line. Stratus landed a hard metal trash can shot to Jazz's head, which badly weakened her and allowed Stratus to win easily. During this time, Stratus began wrestling solely on the Raw brand after being drafted in the WWF Brand Extension.

Stratus' second reign as champion came to an end on June 23, when she was defeated at King of the Ring by Molly Holly. The two Divas continued their storyline feud for the next three months. After a failed attempt to win the title in July, Stratus won the championship for the third time at Unforgiven. While feuding with Holly, Stratus was also involved in an angle with new Diva Victoria, who held a storyline grudge against Stratus, claiming she was betrayed by Stratus when they both worked as fitness models. The two competed in several title matches, with Stratus retaining until Survivor Series, where Victoria won the title in a Hardcore match. Stratus and Victoria took part in the main event of the December 9, 2002 edition of Raw where they were in an intergender Tables match, with Stratus teaming with The Dudley Boyz and Victoria teaming with Chris Jericho and Christian; the match ended in victory for Team Stratus when she Powerbombed Victoria through a table. On March 17, 2003, Victoria and Steven Richards defeated Jazz and Stratus in a tag team match when Jazz walked out on Stratus. After the match, Jeff Hardy saved Stratus from an attack by Victoria and Richards and then kissed her, resulting in Stratus becoming Hardy's on-screen girlfriend once more. The two would talk and kiss backstage, compete as an intergender tag team, and come to each other's aid when in danger during singles competition. At no point was their previous relationship acknowledged. The storyline was suddenly dropped when WWE released Hardy in April. This marked the second time in two years that a romance between Stratus and Hardy abruptly ended due to a setback in one of their personal lives. In neither instance did the angle fully play out or reach a conclusion.

At WrestleMania XIX, Stratus ended her feud with Victoria by defeating her and Jazz to capture her fourth Women's Championship, only to lose the title to Jazz at the following pay-per-view, Backlash. The Raw after Backlash, Eric Bischoff ordered a No Disqualification match between him and Stratus. If Stratus won, she would get a championship rematch the next week; if Bischoff won, he would get to spend a night with her. Bischoff would go on to win the match, though the stipulation was nullified when Linda McMahon confronted him after the match.

Teaming and feuding with Lita (2003–2005) 
In the following months, Stratus was placed into an alliance with Gail Kim. It was short-lived, however, as Kim turned on Stratus and teamed with Molly Holly, putting the women in a storyline feud. The duo defeated Stratus and several tag team partners until Stratus allied herself with a returning Lita. The team defeated Kim and Holly in several matches, including a match at Unforgiven.
Stratus began an on-screen romance with Chris Jericho during the November 10 episode of Raw when she agreed to go on a date with him. Subsequently, they participated in an intergender tag team match as partners on December 1. After the match, Stratus overheard Jericho talking to then-heel, Christian, who was involved in an on-screen romance with Lita at the time, about who could sleep with their respective woman first. One week later, Stratus and Lita confronted the men about their actions, leading to a feud between the two men and women which resulted in a "Battle of the Sexes" tag team match at Armageddon, which the women lost. A rematch the next night ended in a no contest. Her relationship with Jericho continued into the next year with a new angle of Stratus developing feelings for Jericho. Christian would also briefly turn face once again, but only revealed to be a hoax as he would attack and defeat her in a match ordered by Eric Bischoff. This would start a feud between Christian and Jericho, who was defending Stratus. During their match at WrestleMania XX, however, Stratus turned heel by betraying Jericho and siding with Christian. Stratus claimed her reasons for siding with Christian were that he was a "real man", and Jericho was a "love sick puppy". The duo feuded with Jericho for several months and competed in a 2-on-1 Handicap match at Backlash. The team of Stratus and Christian were joined by "problem solver" Tyson Tomko the next night on Raw.

Stratus won the WWE Women's Championship for a fifth time at Bad Blood on June 13. She defended the title until she suffered a legitimate broken hand in July that caused her to be out of action for approximately a month. Upon her return, she continued to defend the title against numerous challengers before losing the championship to Lita on December 6, when both women wrestled in the main event of Raw for the championship. Stratus recaptured the title for the sixth time a month later at New Year's Revolution, after Lita suffered a legitimate knee injury during the match. Stratus was originally booked to lose the championship back to Lita at WrestleMania 21, but due to Lita's injury, she wasn't cleared to wrestle. A new angle was then developed between Stratus and 2004 Raw Diva Search winner Christy Hemme over jealousy of Hemme's Playboy magazine exposure, with Stratus attacking Hemme with a Chick Kick and spray painting the word "slut" across her back. Stratus was challenged by Hemme, who later revealed she was being trained by Lita, for a championship match at WrestleMania 21, where Stratus successfully retained her championship. Stratus would then demand a rematch against Hemme the next night on Raw; before the match started, Stratus hit Hemme again with the Chick Kick, and re-injured Lita's knee. The next week, after losing a tag team match, Stratus was chased around the arena by Lita's storyline husband, Kane, narrowly escaping. The week after, Stratus almost got chokeslammed again onto the stage, but Viscera saved her. Stratus would then form a short-lived alliance with Viscera, who was ordered to protect her.

Storyline with Mickie James and semi-retirement (2005–2006) 

In May 2005, Stratus was sidelined with the Women's Championship after suffering a herniated disc, with the storyline explanation that Viscera had injured her at Backlash after she insulted him for losing to Kane. This left the company without a Women's Champion for four months, as Stratus remained the champion during the time of her injury, thus ignoring the 30-day clause stating that a champion must defend their respective title at least once every 30 days. She returned to Raw on September 12, 2005 as a face by siding with Ashley Massaro against Vince's Devils (Candice Michelle, Victoria and Torrie Wilson). The feud also involved the debuting Mickie James, who introduced herself as Stratus' biggest fan. In November, during the Eddie Guerrero Tribute Show, Stratus took part in an inter-promotional Divas battle royal that was won by SmackDown! Diva Melina. The next week, MNM (Joey Mercury and Johnny Nitro) kidnapped Stratus for Melina, who challenged a tied up and tape gagged Stratus to a match for the Women's Championship. The two fought at Survivor Series, with Stratus defeating Melina. Stratus and Mickie James continued teaming together in late 2005, while James became increasingly obsessed with Stratus. On the December 26 episode of Raw, the storyline between Stratus and James developed into a lesbian one, when James initiated an intimate kiss with Stratus under a sprig of mistletoe, causing a surprised Stratus to flee the locker room. 

The odd relationship between Stratus and James continued into 2006, with the two Divas competing against each other in a title match at New Year's Revolution, where Stratus emerged victorious. Despite the defeat, James continued to be enamored of Stratus which made her feel uncomfortable, and on March 6, Stratus confronted James, telling her that she needed space. The duo briefly reconciled on the March 18 Saturday Night's Main Event XXXII, teaming together to defeat Candice Michelle and Victoria; however, after the match, James turned on Stratus and attacked her. A match at WrestleMania 22 saw Stratus lose the Women's Championship to James, ending her 448-day reign. The match was, and still is, widely recognized as one of the best women's matches in the company. During a rematch at Backlash, Stratus suffered a legitimate dislocated shoulder after taking a bump to the outside of the ring. While she was rehabilitating for six weeks, she continued to appear on-screen. 

Stratus returned to the ring on June 26, where she had a Women's Championship match with Mickie James. Stratus would go on to lose the match, thus finally ending their nine-month long storyline. On the same night, she started a romantic angle with Carlito after he saved her from a double team attack by Melina and Johnny Nitro. They competed as a team, and won a mixed tag team match against Melina and Nitro at Saturday Night's Main Event XXXIII on July 15. As a couple, Stratus and Carlito briefly feuded with WWE Champion Edge and Lita (who turned heel) after the pair interrupted Stratus' title match with Mickie James. The two couples competed in several tag team matches, including a six-person tag team match where Edge, Lita and Randy Orton defeated Stratus, Carlito and John Cena after Orton RKO'd Stratus and Lita followed up with the pin. Stratus' last match on Raw occurred on September 11, 2006 where she defeated former rival Mickie James. In late August, Lita stated that Stratus would retire following Unforgiven, which was later confirmed by Stratus. At Unforgiven on September 17, in her hometown of Toronto, Stratus won against Lita with fellow Canadian Bret Hart's signature submission manoeuvre, the Sharpshooter. Her victory earned her her seventh and final Women's Championship, the most in WWE history, and she retired as the champion. The title was vacated soon after.

WWE Hall of Famer and sporadic appearances (2007–present) 
Stratus and Lita made a special appearance on December 10, 2007 during Raw's 15th Anniversary special, attacking Jillian Hall. The following year, Stratus appeared on Raw in Toronto on May 5, 2008 in a backstage segment involving Ron Simmons and Trevor Murdoch.

Stratus wrestled her first match in over two years on the December 22, 2008 episode of Raw, when she and John Cena defeated Santino Marella and his former on-screen protégé Beth Phoenix in a mixed tag team match. On September 14, 2009, Stratus served as the guest hostess of Raw, and participated in a six-person tag team match, teaming with Montel Vontavious Porter and Mark Henry to defeat Phoenix, Chris Jericho, and Big Show.

Stratus made a surprise appearance at the 2011 Elimination Chamber pay-per-view to announce that she would be a trainer on the revival of WWE Tough Enough and stopped LayCool (Layla & Michelle McCool) from attacking Kelly Kelly. The following month, on March 14, she lost a match to Vickie Guerrero due to interference from LayCool and Dolph Ziggler. After the match, John Morrison and Raw guest star Nicole "Snooki" Polizzi came to her aid. At WrestleMania XXVII, Stratus, Snooki, and Morrison defeated the team of Ziggler and LayCool. The night after WrestleMania, on Raw, Stratus and Morrison defeated Guerrero and Ziggler. She also appeared on Raw on June 6 and SmackDown on September 16. The following year, on July 23, 2012, she made a guest appearance on Raws 1000th episode.

On the January 28, 2013, episode of Raw, Stratus was announced as a WWE Hall of Fame inductee as part of the 2013 class,
Stratus chose Stephanie McMahon to induct her into the Hall of Fame in April. The following year, Stratus inducted Lita into the WWE Hall of Fame. On August 16, 2016, Stratus appeared on WWE Network special WWE 24: Women's Evolution, discussing the history of the women back in her era known as the Attitude Era and also her rivalry with Lita.

On January 22, 2018, during the Raw 25 Years anniversary episode, Stratus was amongst a group of women honoured as some of the greatest female superstars in the twenty-five-year history of the show, along with The Bella Twins, Maryse, Kelly Kelly, Lilian Garcia, Torrie Wilson, Michelle McCool, Terri Runnels, Maria Kanellis, and fellow Hall of Famer Jacqueline. Six days later, Stratus was a surprise entrant in the inaugural all-women's Royal Rumble match at the event. Stratus entered in the final spot, number 30, and scored three eliminations, over Nia Jax, Mickie James and Natalya. Stratus' interaction with James garnered a considerable crowd reaction. Stratus was amongst the final five women in the match, before being eliminated by Sasha Banks.

On August 18, 2018 it was announced by WWE that she would make her in ring return to the company to compete at the Evolution event against Alexa Bliss. On the August 27, 2018 episode of Raw, Stratus made a surprise appearance interrupting Elias and confronting him for talking down on her hometown, the two exchanged insults, culminating in Stratus slapping him. Later in the night, Stratus along with Raw Women's Champion Ronda Rousey and Natalya, were confronted Alexa Bliss, Mickie James, and Alicia Fox and Stratus then served as support along with Ronda Rousey during a one on one match between Natalya and Alicia Fox. She was then seen backstage during the show having a segment with Ronda and Natalya as well as the returning Bella Twins, Nikki and Brie. On the October 8 episode of WWE RAW, Stratus would cut a promo against her then opponent at WWE Evolution, Alexa Bliss. Bliss, along with Mickie James came to the ring to confront Stratus, and challenged her to a tag match at Evolution. Almost immediately, Stratus would announce that Lita (who was originally scheduled to face James at Evolution) would be her tag partner. at the Evolution event, Trish and Lita defeated Mickie James and Alicia Fox (replaced Bliss due to injury).

At the end of July, Stratus returned to the WWE as a guest of Jerry Lawler's "The King's Court" in–ring segment. During the segment, Charlotte Flair interrupted the two and issued a challenge to Stratus to wrestle at SummerSlam, which Stratus accepted. At SummerSlam, in her hometown of Toronto, the returning Stratus lost to Flair by submission in what was originally intended to be her retirement match.

On February 27, 2023, Stratus made her return on Raw, helping Lita and Becky Lynch defeat Damage CTRL (Dakota Kai and Iyo Sky) for the WWE Women's Tag Team Championship by taking out Damage CTRL's leader, Bayley, who tried interfering. The following week, she announced that she would be coming out of retirement to team with Lita and Lynch to face Damage CTRL (Bayley, Kai, and Sky) in a six-woman tag team match at WrestleMania 39.

Legacy 

Stratus is widely regarded as the greatest female superstar of her generation and by some as the greatest female wrestler of all time. Stratus is cited as an inspiration for several female wrestlers, such as: Alexa Bliss, Bayley, Carmella, Deonna Purrazzo, Emma, Kelly Kelly, Kia Stevens, Leila Grey, Mandy Rose, Maria Kanellis, Melina Perez, Michelle McCool, Natalya, Rosa Mendes, Santana Garrett, Sasha Banks, Shazza McKenzie, and Taryn Terrell,
  
In one episode of RAW (September 2020), Mandy Rose paid tribute to Stratus by wearing a pink gear identical to an attire worn by Stratus in early 2000s. She later cited Stratus as her role model. She added; "She's always been my inspiration, and still to this day [she is]." Zelina Vega asserted that Stratus and Lita inspired her to become a professional wrestler. Stratus's feud with Mickie James in 2006 has been an inspiration to Sasha Banks's rivalry with Bayley. Banks has cited Stratus is the one performer from the past she most wants to wrestle. Banks added, "It's going to be Trish Stratus because she was just the top of the women's division of her time. She was just the best, she was beautiful, she was athletic, and she killed it, and inspired me." Jerry Lawler called Stratus his all time favorite female superstar. Booker T in one interview has cited Stratus as the best of all time for women's wrestling while adding "She was the one that broke that barrier more than any other woman on the roster."

Other media

Television 

On June 3, 2006, she hosted the Canada's Walk of Fame induction ceremony and performed a song and dance number inspired by the soundtrack from the film Chicago at the event. During the show, Stratus ad libbed a kiss with fellow Canadian actress Pamela Anderson.

From late November 2006 to mid-January 2007, Stratus temporarily moved to Muncie, Indiana, for the CBS reality show Armed & Famous. She was given a spot in the series after Paul Heyman had mentioned her name to CBS. The concept was that she was one of five celebrities who trained as volunteer officers with the Muncie Police Department. After finishing her training, Stratus and her real life officer partner were followed around by a camera crew while going on legitimate police calls. Although the show was scheduled to broadcast seven episodes starting on January 10, 2007, CBS cancelled the series after just four of the episodes were aired. After the cancellation of Armed & Famous, Stratus hosted The Second City's Next Comedy Legend. The contest was similar to the style of America's Next Top Model, with Stratus portraying the "Tyra Banks" role as contact between the contestants and judges.

Stratus is the host and subject of the show Stratusphere, which debuted in 2008 on the Travel + Escape television channel. The show follows Stratus as she visits different locations around the world to participate in local sports and adventure. Bill Harris wrote that, "Every week, Stratus embarks on a trip in search of exotic locations and daring physical challenges. In the first episode, for example, Stratus is in Kochi, India, where she learns the ancient martial art of kalarippayattu, progressing from fighting with sticks to fighting with metal swords. Through the 10-episode run of Stratusphere, Stratus does everything from reindeer racing in Norway to bungee jumping in Bali. Her athleticism obviously sets Stratusphere apart from most travel shows." Stratus also guest-starred in the Canadian show Da Kink in My Hair new season, which started on February 12, 2009. In 2009, Stratus became a spokesperson for sports betting website, Sports Interaction. Also, she has a YouTube fanpage dedicated to her which has more than 565,000 subscribers as of July 17, 2019.

In 2020, Stratus made a cameo appearance in a TV Christmas movie for Fox called Christmas in the Rockies.

Since March 2021, Stratus appeared as a judge on the second season of Canada's Got Talent.

Film 
Stratus starred in the Canadian independent movie, Bail Enforcers, which marked her acting debut. She played a bounty hunter named Jules Taylor, which released on April 19, 2011, premiering at ActionFest 2011. The movie was then released on DVD as "Bounty Hunters".

Stratus co-starred in the 2015 film Gridlocked, as the antagonist Gina. 

In January 2022, Stratus announced that she had been cast in the lead role for an unnamed Christmas movie which would be released at the end of the year. The movie later revealed to be named Christmas in Rockwell, where she will play a character named Alyssa Strader, a former child actor.

Filmography

Video games

Business ventures 
In 2008, Stratus opened a yoga studio named Stratusphere in the suburbs of Toronto, Ontario. The studio is billed as "Canada's largest eco-friendly yoga studio". In 2009, Stratusphere was awarded Top Choice Awards' Best New Business award, and the following year, Stratus won the award for Business Woman of the Year. The studio won Top Choice Awards' Best Yoga Studio award in 2013. The studio was closed on March 31, 2015.

On December 28, 2020, it was announced that Stratus' online retail platform named Stratusphere Shop was awarded a 2021 Canadian Business Award for Best Celebrity News Platform & Online Retailer. Stratusphere Shop was also awarded the Business Excellence Award for Best Women's Merchandise Platform in Canada.

Personal life 
Stratigeas is of Greek and Polish descent and is the eldest daughter of John and Alice Stratigeas. Her younger sisters are named Christie and Melissa. Stratigeas married her high school sweetheart and boyfriend of fourteen years, Ron Fisico, on September 30, 2006. Several WWE Divas were in attendance at the wedding, and her bridal gown was featured on a cover of Today's Bride magazine. Shortly after the wedding, Stratus got the call to be a part of Armed & Famous, so she filmed the show instead of going on her honeymoon.

Stratigeas and Fisico have two children, a son born in 2013 and a daughter born in 2017. Fellow wrestler Amy "Lita" Dumas is her son's godmother.

Stratigeas has also been involved with numerous charities such as Ronald McDonald House, Dreams Take Flight, and the Special Olympics. From 2001, she was a spokesperson for the World Natural Sports Association. On March 29, 2008, she participated in the Island Triathlon Series as part of a celebrity relay team to help raise money for Dignitas International.

On September 19, 2022, Stratus revealed on her Instagram page that she drove herself to hospital after suffering pain where she had a successful emergency appendix surgery.

Championships and accomplishments 

 The Baltimore Sun
 Best Female Wrestler of the Decade (2010)
 Cauliflower Alley Club
 Iron Mike Mazurki Award (2016)
 Fighting Spirit Magazine
 Double X Award (2006)
 Three Degrees Award (2006)
 George Tragos/Lou Thesz Professional Wrestling Hall of Fame
 Lou Thesz Award (2020)
 Guinness World Records
 World record: Most WWE Women's Championships (7 times)
 Ontario Sports Hall of Fame
 Sandy Hawley Community Service Award (2017)
 Pro Wrestling Illustrated
 Woman of the Year (2002, 2003, 2005, 2006)
 Woman of the Decade (2000–2009)
 World Wrestling Federation / Entertainment / WWE
 WWE Hardcore Championship (1 time)
 WWE Women's Championship (7 times)
 WWE Hall of Fame (Class of 2013)
 Babe of the Year (2001–2003)
 Diva of the Decade (2003)
 Ranked No. 1 of the top 50 Greatest WWE Female Superstars of all time (2021)
 Wrestling Observer Newsletter
 Worst Worked Match of the Year (2002)

References

Footnotes

External links 

 
 
 
 

1975 births
21st-century professional wrestlers
Canadian female professional wrestlers
Canada's Got Talent judges
Canadian people of Greek descent
Canadian people of Polish descent
Female models from Ontario
Fitness and figure competitors
Living people
Professional wrestlers from Toronto
Professional wrestling managers and valets
WWE Hall of Fame inductees
WWF/WWE Hardcore Champions
WWF/WWE Women's Champions